Orthoperus is a genus of minute hooded beetles in the family Corylophidae. There are more than 20 described species in Orthoperus.

Species
These 28 species belong to the genus Orthoperus:

 Orthoperus aeneocollis Blatchley, 1927
 Orthoperus aequalis Sharp in Blackburn & Sharp, 1885
 Orthoperus alutaceus Casey, 1900
 Orthoperus anxius Mulsant & Rey, 1861
 Orthoperus arizonicus Casey, 1900
 Orthoperus atomarius (Heer, 1841)
 Orthoperus atomus (Gyllenhal, 1808)
 Orthoperus bahamicus Casey, 1900
 Orthoperus brunneus (Casey, 1900)
 Orthoperus brunnipes (Gyllenhal, 1808)
 Orthoperus corticalis (Redtenbacher, 1845)
 Orthoperus cribratus Matthews, 1899
 Orthoperus crotchii Matthews, 1899
 Orthoperus glaber (LeConte, 1852)
 Orthoperus gracilipes Matthews, 1899
 Orthoperus intersitus Bruce, 1951
 Orthoperus loebli Bowestead, 1999
 Orthoperus lucidus Casey
 Orthoperus micros Casey, 1900
 Orthoperus minutissimus Matthews, 1899
 Orthoperus nigrescens Stephens, 1829
 Orthoperus piceus Casey
 Orthoperus princeps Casey, 1900
 Orthoperus punctatus Wankowicz, 1865
 Orthoperus rogeri Kraatz, 1874
 Orthoperus scutellaris LeConte, 1878
 Orthoperus suturalis LeConte, 1852
 Orthoperus texanus Casey, 1900

References

Further reading

External links

 

Corylophidae
Articles created by Qbugbot
Coccinelloidea genera